Christopher Allsopp (born 6 April 1941) is a British economist. He was Director of the Oxford Institute for Energy Studies from 2006-2013, is Emeritus Fellow of New College, Oxford, and a Reader in Economic Policy at the University of Oxford.

A former Director of the Bank of England (1997–2000) and Member of its Monetary Policy Committee (2000–2003), he has recently completed a Review of Statistics for Economic Policymaking (the 'Allsopp Review'). He is the Editor of the Oxford Review of Economic Policy and a Director of Oxford Economic Forecasting. Previous activities include working at HM Treasury, the OECD and the Bank of England (where he was Adviser from 1980–83) as well as extensive involvement with domestic and international policy issues as consultant to international institutions and private sector organisations. He has published extensively on monetary, fiscal and exchange rate issues as well as the problems of economic reform and transition.

His involvement in the economics of oil and other energy issues goes back to the shocks of the 1970s.

References

External links
 Home page Economics Faculty of Oxford University
 Oxford Institute for Energy Studies

Living people
British economists
Fellows of New College, Oxford
1941 births
Academics of the Oxford Institute for Energy Studies
Alumni of Nuffield College, Oxford